Howard Bagnall Meek (October 30, 1893 – July 16, 1969) was an American professor who founded Cornell University's School of Hotel Administration. He began teaching hotel management at Cornell during 1922, when the subject was part of the university's agricultural college, which operated its home-economics school, rather than a separate unit within the university.

References

1893 births
1969 deaths
Educators from New York (state)
Writers from Chelsea, Massachusetts
Boston University College of Arts and Sciences alumni
University of Maine alumni
Yale University alumni
Cornell University faculty